Qaṣabah Jarash is one of the districts of Jerash governorate, Jordan.

References 

Districts of Jordan